The second season of The Real Housewives of Miami, an American reality television series, was broadcast on Bravo. It aired from 	September 13, 2012 until January 8, 2013 and was primarily filmed in Miami, Florida. Its executive producers are Matt Anderson, Nate Green and Andy Cohen.

The Real Housewives of Miami focuses on the lives of Lea Black, Adriana De Moura, Marysol Patton, Lisa Hochstein, Joanna Krupa, Ana Quincoces and Karent Sierra. It consisted of eighteen episodes.

Production and crew
The Real Housewives of Miami was officially green-lit for the return of the series for a second season by Bravo, after averaging 1.09 million total viewers for its first season. The reunion was filmed on November 30, 2012, and later aired in two-parts. The season premiered with "A Tale of Two Miamis" on September 13, 2012, while the fifteenth episode "Healing Hole" served as the season finale, and was aired on December 20, 2012.
It was followed by a two-part reunion special that aired on December 27, 2012 and January 3, 2013, and a "Lost Footage" episode on January 8, 2013, which marked the conclusion of the season. Matt Anderson, Nate Green and Andy Cohen are recognized as the series' executive producers; it is produced and distributed by Purveyors of Pop.

Cast and synopsis
Three of the six housewives featured on the first season of The Real Housewives of Miami returned for the second installment. Larsa Pippen and Cristy Rice were let go from the series. Alexia Echevarria stepped back during the second series and was reduced to a recurring role. Echevarria decided to focus most of her time looking after her 13-year-old son after he had been injured in a car accident. With the departure of 2 main cast member and the demotion of another, it allowed room for 4 new cast members to join the series which included, bombshell Lisa Hochstein, supermodel Joanna Krupa, successful lawyer and chef Ana Quincoces and celebrity dentist Karent Sierra.

 Echevarria was seated on the end of the left couch, next to Quincoces.

Episodes

References

External links
 
 

The Real Housewives of Miami
2012 American television seasons
2013 American television seasons